Penagalur is a village in Annamayya district of the Indian state of Andhra Pradesh. It is located in Penagalur mandal of Badvel revenue division.

Geography 
It has an average elevation of 103 meters 341 feet).

References 

Villages in Kadapa district;3